From 1970 to 1984, United Press International (UPI) awarded the NFC Player of the Year award to players from the National Football League's National Football Conference (NFC). An NFC Defensive Player of the Year was named from 1975 to 1996, and an NFC Offensive Player of the Year, which replaced the overall player of the year award in 1985, was issued until 1996.

Winners

One selection only

Offense and Defense selections

Multiple-time winners

See also
UPI AFL-AFC Player of the Year
United Press International NFL Most Valuable Player Award
National Football League Most Valuable Player Award
NFL Offensive Player of the Year Award
NFL Defensive Player of the Year Award

References

National Football League trophies and awards